Brett Michael Solkhon (born 12 September 1982) is an English footballer who plays for  side St Ives Town, on dual registration from  side Kettering Town, where he plays as a defender.

Playing career

Ipswich Town & Arsenal
Born on Canvey Island, England, Solkhon was born at Rochford hospital in Essex and attended Castle View School on Canvey Island from 1994 to 1999.

He played at youth level for Ipswich Town and Arsenal.

Rushden & Diamonds
Brett signed for Rushden & Diamonds in 2000 where he played for two seasons, helping them to secure promotion to the Conference National. Solkhon made 9 appearances in all competitions, he was also loaned out to Canvey Island for the 2002–03 season.

Kettering Town
Solkhon signed for Kettering Town in 2003 and became their longest serving player of nearly five years. He played in many historic Kettering FA Cup matches, most notably against Notts County against whom he scored and got an assist in a 2–1 win, and Fulham to whom Kettering lost 2–4, with 2 goals from Craig Westcarr. He was released by Kettering in May 2009.

Corby Town
Solkhon signed for newly promoted Corby Town in the Conference North on 22 May 2009. He made 28 appearances and scored three goals during the 2009–10 season, but departed the club in March 2010.

Brackley Town
Brett moved to Brackley Town in 2011, where he was a part of their Southern League Premier Division championship winning side. In 2014.

Kettering Town
Solkhon once again rejoined Kettering Town for his third spell, winning the Southern League Division One Central title in his first season.

Brett agreed to re-sign for Kettering Town for the 2018–19 season.

St Ives Town
Solkhon joined Southern League Premier Central side St Ives Town on dual registration in September 2020.

Personal life

Betting scandal
On 31 July 2015, it was revealed that Solkhon, and a teammate, Elliot Sandy had been involved in betting, and consequently were charged by the FA. These bets related to the Estonia Meistriliiga, Gambon Championnat and Moldova Divizia B.

Career statistics

Club

Honours

Club

Rushden & Diamonds
Conference National: 2000–01

Kettering Town
Conference North: 2007–08
Southern League Division One Central: 2014–15
Hillier Cup: 2016–17, 2017–18
Southern League Premier Central: 2018–19

Brackley Town
Southern League Premier Division: 2011–12

References

External links

1982 births
Living people
People from Canvey Island
English footballers
Association football defenders
Rushden & Diamonds F.C. players
Canvey Island F.C. players
Kettering Town F.C. players
Corby Town F.C. players
Brackley Town F.C. players
St Ives Town F.C. players
English Football League players
National League (English football) players